The 1982 PBA season was the eighth season of the Philippine Basketball Association (PBA).

Board of governors

Executive committee
 Leopoldo L. Prieto (Commissioner) 
 Domingo Y. Itchon  (President, representing YCO-Tanduay)

Teams

Season highlights
The start of the year saw the league's membership reduced from 10 teams to just 8, following the disbandment of CDCP and Tefilin franchises.
Vintage Enterprises Inc. took over the league's television coverage beginning this season.
The PBA implement for the first time a playoff post-eliminations format with a series of best-of-three quarterfinals, best-of-five semifinals and best-of-seven finals to determine the champion in the Reinforced Filipino Conference.
Toyota Super Corollas won two championships in the year, capped by center Ramon Fernandez winning his first Most Valuable Player Award.
San Miguel Beer won the Invitational championship over Crispa Redmanizers for the franchise' 2nd PBA title. 
Baby Dalupan resigned as Crispa head coach after the Redmanizers got eliminated in the third conference. This season became the second time the multi-titled ballclub did not win any championship. 
Leo Prieto and Domingo Itchon stepped down as the league commissioner and board president respectively at the end of the season.

All-Star series
A PBA North vs South All-Star series were held in Cebu City and Manila. The North and South team split their two-game series. Emerging as the All-Star MVP was Toyota's Arnie Tuadles, who scored 50 points in the first match.

Opening ceremonies
The muses for the participating teams are as follows:

Champions
 Reinforced Filipino Conference: Toyota Super Corollas
 Invitational Conference: San Miguel Beermen
 Open Conference: Toyota Super Corollas
 Team with best win–loss percentage: San Miguel Beermen (40-26, .606)
 Best Team of the Year: Toyota Super Corollas (4th & Final)

Reinforced Filipino Conference

Elimination round

Playoffs

Finals

|}
Best Import of the Conference: Norman Black (Magnolia)

Invitational Championship

Elimination round

Third place playoffs 

|}

Finals

|}

Open Conference

Elimination round

Quarterfinal round

Semifinal round

Finals

|}
Best Import of the Conference: Donnie Ray Koonce (Toyota)

Awards
 Most Valuable Player: Ramon Fernandez (Toyota)
 Rookie of the Year:  Marte Saldaña (San Miguel)
 Best Import-Reinforced Conference: Norman Black (San Miguel)
 Best Import-Open Conference: Donnie Ray Koonce (Toyota)
 Mythical Five:
Francis Arnaiz (Toyota)
Atoy Co (Crispa)
Ramon Fernandez (Toyota)
Bogs Adornado (U/Tex)
Abe King (Toyota)

Cumulative standings

References

 
PBA